Trichodiadema pomeridianum ("Perde vygie") is a succulent plant of the genus Trichodiadema, widespread in the arid central Karoo regions of South Africa.

Description
It grows as a loosely branching semi-erect shrublet up to 30cm high. The internodes are long, and rough from minute white papillae. 

The leaves are ca. 15 mm long and ca. 2 mm wide. The leaf surfaces are densely covered in bladder cells that do not have papillae (except at the basal leaf margins). The leaf tips have simple diadems of 3-8 yellow bristles, radiating from similarly yellow cup cells. 

The petals are pink-to-purple in colour, and born in two series.

This species is easily confused with T. setuliferum, which however has much longer leaves (reaching 24mm).

References

pomeridianum
Taxa named by Louisa Bolus